The Brisbane Lions' drafting and trading history has lasted almost as long as the club's existence, with the club first drafting in 1996 and first trading in 1997. The club was founded in 1996 following a merger between the Fitzroy Football Club and the Brisbane Bears. This page does not include any drafts or trades performed by those two clubs. It includes drafts and trades from both the Australian Football League and the AFL Women's.

AFL

1996/97 off-season

Players from the Brisbane Bears and Fitzroy Football Club

After the merger between the Bears and Fitzroy, the Brisbane Lions received a number of players from each club. These players formed most of the Lions' inaugural squad.

Players from the Brisbane Bears

Jason Akermanis
Marcus Ashcroft
Trent Bartlett
Andrew Bews
Daniel Bradshaw
Richard Champion
Nathan Chapman
Matthew Clarke
Danny Dickfos
Adrian Fletcher
Andrew Gowers
Andrew Gowling
Brent Green
Shaun Hart
Clark Keating
Matthew Kennedy
Craig Lambert
Nigel Lappin
Steven Lawrence
Justin Leppitsch
Alastair Lynch
Tristan Lynch
Scott McIvor
Michael McLean
Craig McRae
Ben Robbins
Chris Scott
Dion Scott
Nick Trask
Brett Voss
Michael Voss
Darryl White
Derek Wirth

Players from Fitzroy Football Club

Scott Bamford
John Barker
Brad Boyd
Nick Carter
Shane Clayton
Simon Hawking
Chris Johnson
Jarrod Molloy

Drafting

1997/98 off-season

Drafting

Trading

1998/99 off-season

Drafting

Rookie elevation

Tate Day

Trading

1999/2000 off-season

Drafting

Rookie elevation

Trent Knobel

Trading

2000/01 off-season

Drafting

Rookie elevations

Nathan Clarke
Shannon Rusca

Trading

2001/02 off-season

Drafting

Rookie elevation

Robert Copeland

Trading

2002/03 off-season

Drafting

Trading

2003/04 off-season

Drafting

Rookie elevation

Joel Macdonald

Trading

2004/05 off-season

Drafting

Rookie elevation

Leigh Ryswyk

Trading

2005/06 off-season

Drafting

Rookie elevation

Josh Drummond

2006/07 off-season

Drafting

Rookie elevations

Marcus Allan
Scott Harding
Jason Roe
Cheynee Stiller

Trading

2007/08 off-season

Drafting

Rookie elevation

Anthony Corrie

Trading

2008/09 off-season

Drafting

Rookie elevation

Scott Clouston

Trading

2009/10 off-season

Drafting

Trading

2010/11 off-season

Drafting

Trading

Gold Coast uncontracted player signings

Upon the Gold Coast Football Club's entry into the AFL, the new club was allowed to sign one uncontracted player from each club in the league, and more with permission from a player's club.

2011/12 off-season

Drafting

Trading

2012/13 off-season

Drafting

Trading

Free agency

2013/14 off-season

Drafting

Trading

Free agency

2014/15 off-season

Drafting

Trading

Free agency

2015/16 off-season

Drafting

Trading

Free agency

2016/17 off-season

Drafting

Category B rookie selections

Rookie elevation

Archie Smith

Trading

Free agency

2017/18 off-season

Drafting

Category B rookie selection

Trading

Free agency

2018/19 off-season

Drafting

Category B rookie selections

Trading

Free agency

AFL Women's

2016/17 off-season

Marquee player signings

Sabrina Frederick-Traub
Tayla Harris

Priority player signings

Kaitlyn Ashmore
Emma Zielke

Rookie player signings

Drafting

Free agent signings

Shannon Campbell
Caitlin Collins
Jordan Membrey

2017/18 off-season

Drafting

Trading

2018/19 off-season

Drafting

Post-draft rookie compensation selections

Rookie player signing

Rookie elevation

Gabby Collingwood

Trading

Free agency

Expansion club signings

Before the Geelong and North Melbourne Football Clubs' entries into the AFL Women's, the new clubs were allowed to sign a total of four players from each club in the league, and more with permission from a player's club.

Registered inactive player

Prior to the season, clubs were permitted to list any inactive players, retaining them while also replacing them with active players for 2019.

2019/20 off-season

Drafting

Rookie player signings

Trading

Free agency

Expansion club signings

Before the entries of Gold Coast, Richmond, St Kilda and West Coast into the AFL Women's, the new clubs were allowed to sign a maximum total of eight players from the Lions.

2020/21 off-season

Drafting

Rookie player signing

Trading

Registered inactive player

Prior to the season, clubs were permitted to list any inactive players, retaining them while also replacing them with active players for 2021.

References

Drafting and trading history
Australian Football League draft
AFL Women's draft